Alphonse Rabbe (Alpes-de-Haute-Provence, 1784 (?) – Paris, 31 December 1829) was a French writer, historian, critic, and journalist.

Life
Rabbe was a journalist, writing mostly about the arts. He also published a number of works of popularised history. Disfigured by syphilis and addicted to opium in an effort to make his life bearable, Rabbe is today remembered for his Album d'un pessimiste in which he writes of the pointlessness of existence. It was published posthumously in 1835. He is also thought to have penned a novel, La Sœur grise, but the manuscript has not survived. Despite his almost complete detachment from society, he was friends with some of the most important literary figures of his day including Victor Hugo, Alexandre Dumas, père, and Benjamin Constant. He died in 1829 from an overdose of laudanum. Though little known today, he inspired like-minded writers such as Baudelaire and Cioran.

Works
 introduction to Voyage pittoresque en Espagne by A.Laborde, 1808
 Précis d'histoire de la Russie, 1812
 Résumé de l'histoire d' Espagne, 1823
 Résumé de l'histoire du Portugal, 1823
 Résumé de l'histoire de la Russie, 1825
 Histoire d'Alexandre I empereur de Russie, 1826
 Album d’un pessimiste (1835)

References
 France, Peter (Ed.) (1995). The New Oxford Companion to Literature in French. Oxford: Clarendon Press. 
 Frey, John Andrew (1999). A Victor Hugo Encyclopedia. Westport, CT: Greenwood Press. 
 Boura, Olivier (2017): Dictionnaire des écrivains marseillais, Marseille, éditions Gaussen
 de Wieclawik, Lucienne (1963): Alphonse Rabbe dans la mêlée politique et littéraire de la Restauration (thèse présentée à la Sorbonne pour le doctorat ès lettres), Librairie Nizet, Paris
 Véron, Louis-Désiré Véron (reprint 1836): Revue de Paris, vol. 32, p. 58 (onlin version)
 Touraine, Yves (1960): Le Suicide ascétique: essai, Nouvelles Éditions Debresse, 115 pages, p. 76

1780s births
1829 deaths
French male writers
Drug-related suicides in France